Bahirji Naik, (original name Bhairavnath Jadhav), was a 17th century Maratha spy and head of intelligence department in the army of Chatrapati Shivaji Maharaj. Bahirji was honoured with title of "Naik" by King Shivaji due to his great work.

As Shivaji maharaj ’s Chief of Intelligence, he was very successful in his methods. 
His tomb is currently situated on Bhupalgad (Banurgad) in Khanapur taluka of Sangli district. He was born in the village of Shingave Naik, Ahmednagar. In 1692, Bahirji's son, Tukoji Naik, built Ram Mandir and the outer border of the Shingave village. A stone bearing an inscription of his name is kept in the Ram Mandir.

Not much is or was known about the early life of Bahirji, except that his expeditions and adventures as a spy in Shivaji maharaj’s army greatly contributed to the success of the Maratha Empire.

Role during wars
It is said that when a knight from Adil Shah, Afzal Khan, started his journey towards the Maratha Empire in order to capture it, Bahirji poisoned the lead flag-bearing elephants. This led to the enemy abandoning the quest. (The death of a flag-bearing elephant was considered a bad omen.) 

In Umbar Khind, a mountain pass near Lonavala, Shivaji maharaj ambushed and defeated the 20,000-strong army of Colonel Kartalab Khan, a well-known military officer of Shahiste Khan, in the Battle of Umberkhind. This victory is attributed to Bahirji's intelligence collection. Shivaji maharaj captured valuable military equipment and accepted the deserters from Khan's army into his own.

Role during covert operations

Shivaji made a surprise attack on Shahiste Khan in Khan's military camp at Pune under the cover of darkness to kill Khan and thus demoralize his army. Khan survived this daring attack but lost three fingers. Shivaji escaped to Sinhagad, while drawing Khan's army into a wild chase to a mountain pass in Katraj. Khan did not die, but he and his army were thoroughly demoralized by the campaign. Within three days of Shivaji’s failed assassination, Khan left Pune.

Role during invasions

Bahirji was a key person in Shivaji Maharaj’s many surprise victories and escapes. Despite having a smaller army, Shivaji attacked Surat, Aurangzeb's financial capital, twice, once in 1664 and later in 1670, and carried away much of its wealth as recompense for the costs incurred and pain suffered by Shivaji Maharaj's citizens during the years of occupation by Aurangzeb's army. None of the ordinary citizens of Surat were attacked or looted.

Shivaji Maharaj escaped from Aurangzeb's jail in Agra, even though the jail itself was surrounded by a 1,000-strong army under an able commander, and subsequently traveled 700 miles through Aurangzeb's kingdom to complete his escape.

In a second expedition to Surat, Colonel Ikhlas Khan chased Shivaji Maharaj’s army to Kanchan Bari (near Nasik), where they engaged in open battle. Khan was unable to maintain the advantage of surprise and lost; Shivaji Maharaj captured valuable military equipment from Khan due to his victory in the six-hour battle.

In popular culture 

 Bahirji Naik, Marathi language film released in 1943 
 The first episode of the 2014 Indian Epic TV anthology television series about India's legendry spies, Adrishya, is about Naik. 
 His character was significantly depicted in Nitin Desai's serial Raja Shivchatrapati, it was aired on Star Pravah.
 In the Marathi language film Farzand, the role of Bahirji Naik was played by Prasad Oak
 In Fatteshikast, the role of Bahirji was played by Harish Dudhade.
In Marathi film Pawankhind, the role of Bahirji Naik was played by Harish Dudhade.
 In film Sher Shivraj, the role of Bahirji Naik was played by its director Digpal Lanjekar 
 Naik the upcoming Bahirji Naik biopic by Nikhil Ravindra Kuwar

See also
 Ravindra Kaushik
 Ajit Doval

References

 17th-century men
 17th-century spies
Year of birth missing
Year of death missing
Indian spies
People of the Maratha Empire